Naphthoquinones constitute a class of organic compounds structurally related to naphthalene. Two isomers are common for the parent naphthoquinones:
 1,2-Naphthoquinone
 1,4-Naphthoquinone

Natural products 

 Alkannin
 Hexahydroxy-1,4-naphthalenedione
 Juglone
 Lapachol
 Lawsone
 Menatetrenone
 2-Methoxy-1,4-naphthoquinone, a compound found in Impatiens species
 Nigrosporin B
 2,3,5,6,8-Pentahydroxy-1,4-naphthalenedione
 Phylloquinone
 Plumbagin
 2,3,5,7-Tetrahydroxy-1,4-naphthalenedione
 Vitamin K and related compounds

Synthetic naphthoquinones
 Menadione (2-Methyl-1,4-naphthoquinone), a vitamin K mimic
 5,8-Dihydroxy-1,4-naphthoquinone and dihydroxynaphthoquinones
 Atovaquone
 Buparvaquone, an antiprotozoal drug used in veterinary medicine
 Diazonaphthoquinone, a diazo derivative of naphthoquinone
 1,2-Naphthoquinone, from the biodegradation of naphthalene.

See also 
 Hydroxynaphthoquinones

References 

 

pt:Naftoquinona